Tom Desmet (born 29 November 1969 in Kortrijk) is a Belgian former cyclist, who competed professionally from 1991 until 2002. He is the son of professional cyclist Armand Desmet.

Major results

1990
 1st Internationale Wielertrofee Jong Maar Moedig
 2nd Flèche Ardennaise
1991
 3rd Overall Paris–Bourges
1993
 3rd De Kustpijl
 10th Japan Cup Cycle Road Race
1994
 7th Grand Prix d'Ouverture La Marseillaise
 9th Tour de Vendée
1995
 8th Kampioenschap van Vlaanderen
1997
 4th Omloop van het Waasland
 4th Grand Prix de la Ville de Lillers
 6th Nationale Sluitingprijs
 7th Overall Driedaagse van De Panne-Koksijde
 9th Druivenkoers Overijse
1998
 3rd Le Samyn
 6th Dwars door België
 6th GP de la Ville de Villers
 6th Nokere Koerse
1999
 10th Kuurne–Brussels–Kuurne
2000
 3rd GP Rudy Dhaenens
 4th Omloop van de Westhoek
 4th Brussels–Ingooigem
 8th Omloop van de Vlaamse Scheldeboorden
 10th Omloop van het Houtland
2001
 1st GP Raf Jonckheere
 8th Brussels–Ingooigem
2002
 6th Hel van het Mergelland
 7th Grote 1-MeiPrijs

References

1969 births
Living people
Belgian male cyclists
Sportspeople from Kortrijk
Cyclists from West Flanders